Yacha is a town of Longlin Various Nationalities Autonomous County, Guangxi, China. , it has 7 villages under its administration.

References

Towns of Guangxi
Longlin Various Nationalities Autonomous County
Towns and townships in Baise